Hessloch or Heßloch may refer to:

 Dittelsheim-Heßloch, Rhineland-Palatinate, Germany
 Wiesbaden-Heßloch, Hessen, Germany

See also
 Haßloch, a municipality in the Bad Dürkheim district in Rhineland-Palatinate, Germany